Ybáñez is a Basque surname. Notable people with the surname include:
Enzo Ybañez (born 1998), Argentine footballer
Juan Bautista Ybáñez, Paraguayan politician and leader of the Green Party
Warren Ybañez (born 1979), Filipino basketball player
Zenaida Ybañez-Chavez (born 1970/1971), Filipina volleyball player

See also
Los Ybanez, a city in Dawson County, Texas, United States
Sgt. Ernesto 'Boy' Ybañez: Tirtir Gang, a 1988 Filipino action film

Basque-language surnames